Columbia High School may refer to:

Columbia High School (Huntsville, Alabama)
Columbia High School (Georgia)
Columbia High School (Florida)
Columbia High School (Idaho)
Columbia High School (Illinois)
Columbia High School (Mississippi), a Mississippi Landmark
Columbia High School (Columbia, Missouri)
Columbia High School (New Jersey), Maplewood, New Jersey
Columbia High School (New York), East Greenbush, New York
Columbia High School (Ohio)
Columbia High School (South Carolina)
Columbia High School (Texas)
Columbia High School (Burbank, Washington)
Columbia High School (White Salmon, Washington)

See also
Columbia Borough School District, Columbia, Pennsylvania
Columbia City High School, Columbia City, Indiana
Columbia River High School, Vancouver, Washington
Southern Columbia Area School District, Catawissa, Pennsylvania